"Rain" is a song by South Korean singers Soyou and Baekhyun, members of K-pop groups Sistar and EXO, respectively. It was released on February 14, 2017, by Starship Entertainment.

Background and release 
On February 6, 2017, Soyou and Baekhyun were announced by Starship Entertainment to be collaborating on a duet titled "Rain". The song reflects the melancholic feelings of nostalgia that accompanies the rain after a relationship comes to an end. On February 9, a teaser video of the two singers recording the song was released. On February 14, the song was released digitally accompanied by its music video. On February 15, Starship Entertainment released a behind-the-scenes video of the song's recording session.

Music video 
The music video features a high school student (starred An Yu-jin, member of IVE) reminiscing on a rainy day by herself while listening to music. It hit 1 million views in less than a day from its release. On February 15, Starship Entertainment released a special clip of the music video starring Soyou.

Reception
Upon release, "Rain" quickly reached the top on every South Korean online music charts, an achievement known as "all-kill". The song debuted at number two on the South Korean Gaon Digital Chart. The song placed first on QQ Music's K-pop chart as well as on YinYueTai's weekly music video chart.

Charts

Sales

Awards and nominations

Release history

References

External links 
 "Rain" music video on 1theK
 "Rain" special clip, Soyou version
 "Rain" making film

Baekhyun songs
2017 songs
2017 singles
Korean-language songs
Starship Entertainment singles